Brixton station may refer to:

 Brixton railway station
 Brixton tube station, southern terminus for the Victoria Line